Sarvajan Kalyan Loktantrik Party (SKLP) is a political party in the state of Bihar in India. The party was floated by Akshay Verma on 11 March 2014.

References

External links 
 

2014 establishments in Bihar
Political parties in Bihar